Lake Link or Link Lake may refer to:

Canada
Link Lake (Temagami), in Ontario
 Link Lake (Ocean Falls), in Ocean Falls, British Columbia

United States
Link Lake in Matanuska-Susitna Borough, Alaska
Lake Link in Polk County, Florida
South Three Links Lakes in Idaho County, Idaho
Minnesota
Lake Linka in Pope County
Bobo Link Lake in Cass County
Link Lake in Itasca County
Link Lake in Lake County
Missing Link Lake in Cook County
Raven Lake a.k.a. Link Lake in Lake County
Link Lake in Flathead County, Montana
Oregon
Link Lake in Jefferson County
Link Lake in Lake County
Texas
Link Lake Number 1 in Webb County
Link Lake Number 2 in Webb County